The Northwestern Undertones are a 20-member co-ed collegiate a cappella group from Northwestern University in Evanston. Founded in 2001 by Jeni Noerenberg, the group was originally called Something Old, Something NU, but the name changed within a year.

Today the Undertones tour both nationally and internationally. Over the past decade they have performed in Washington D.C., California, Miami, Philadelphia, St. Louis, Houston, Boston, and Edinburgh, Scotland. They perform three shows on campus a year, compete in the International Collegiate Championships of A Cappella, do gigs in the Chicago area, and record albums.

The track "Get Set" was selected for inclusion on the collegiate a cappella compilation album "Voices Only 2009" and the track "Perfect Day" was nominated for a CARA for Best Mixed Collegiate Arrangement. The album was moderately well received by the Recorded A Cappella Review Board.

The track "Before The Worst" selected for inclusion on the collegiate a cappella compilation album "BOCA 2011: Best of Collegiate A Cappella" and was nominated for a CARA for Best Mixed Collegiate Arrangement. Robert Dietz said that the arrangements are, "some of the best I've heard from the collegiate community," and the track "Eet" was selected as one of their Songs of the Year for 2011.

Their current album, released March 2013 is titled "Rock Paper Shotgun". It was nominated by the Contemporary A Cappella Recording Society for Best Mixed Collegiate album. The album's opening track "Plain Gold Ring" was nominated for Best Mixed Arrangement and Best Solo and was included in the compilations "Voices Only 2013" and CASA's "sing 10: neon." The track "Gunpowder and Lead" was nominated for Best Mixed Collegiate song, and the track "Bluebird" was selected for "Voices Only 2014."

Awards

See also
 List of collegiate a cappella groups in the United States
 Northwestern University

References

External links
Official Website
Official YouTube Channel
Northwestern University

Collegiate a cappella groups
Northwestern University
Musical groups established in 2001
2001 establishments in Illinois